Apoorva Arora is an Indian actress and model who appears in Hindi, Gujarati, Punjabi and Kannada films. She has also appeared in various web series and music videos.

Career
She stars in Hindi, Kannada, Punjabi and Gujarati films.

She entered Kannada films through the movie Siddhartha which starred Vinay Rajkumar in a lead role, which was her debut movie. Many people who saw the movie mistook her to be daughter of famous Telugu actress Amala Akkineni.

The first time she got a role in the film was at the age of 12 years. She went on to star in various ad campaigns and became a household face, especially after her Glam up and Cadbury perk ads. Currently, Apoorva is one of the most sought-after faces. In 2012, she assumed the role of explorer in Discovery Kids' documentary television series, named Mystery Hunters India. She is also a part of YouTube channel FilterCopy. Her video, Every School Romance, starring alongside Rohan Shah had 7.5 million views in 5 days on YouTube. She also starred in a College Romance web series alongside Gagan Arora. She has also acted in YouTube web series titled Wrong Number, with the character name of Khushi.

Filmography

Films

Web series

Music videos

References

External links 
 

Indian child actresses
Indian television actresses
Living people
21st-century Indian actresses
Actresses from New Delhi
Indian female dancers
Female models from Delhi
Dancers from Delhi
Actresses in Hindi cinema
Actresses in Kannada cinema
Actresses in Gujarati cinema
Year of birth missing (living people)